Difluoroacetylene is a compound of carbon and fluorine having molecular formula C2F2.  A linear molecule, its two carbons are joined by a triple bond and have terminal fluorines:  F-C≡C-F.  The molecule is the perfluorocarbon analog of acetylene, C2H2.  Preparation of difluoracetylene is difficult, with danger of explosions and with low yields. Nevertheless, the compound has been made, isolated, and characterized by NMR and IR spectroscopy.  The compound is of interest as a precursor to fluoropolymers containing double bonds, analogous to polyacetylene.

See also 
Higher halogen homologues:
 Dichloroacetylene
 Dibromoacetylene
 Diiodoacetylene

References

Bibliography

Dihaloacetylenes
Fluorocarbons